The 2020 season was the 13th season for the Indian Premier League franchise Kolkata Knight Riders (KKR). They were one of the eight teams that competed in the 2020 Indian Premier League. The franchise previously qualified for the IPL playoffs in 2011 and won the tournament in 2012 and 2014. The team is being captained by Eoin Morgan with Brendon McCullum as the new team coach. The team finished 5th and could not qualify for the playoffs.

Background

Player retention and transfers 

The Kolkata Knight Riders retained 13 players and released ten players. On 12 September, Ali Khan becomes first USA cricketer to join IPL as replacement for Harry Gurney.

Retained Dinesh Karthik, Andre Russell, Sunil Narine, Kuldeep Yadav, Shubman Gill, Lockie Ferguson, Nitish Rana, Rinku Singh, Prasidh Krishna, Sandeep Warrier, Harry Gurney, Kamlesh Nagarkoti, Shivam Mavi.
Released Chris Lynn, Carlos Brathwaite, Nikhil Naik, KC Cariappa, Joe Denly, Shrikant Mundhe, Yarra Prithviraj, Anrich Nortje.
Acquired via trade Siddhesh Lad.

Auction

KKR went into the auction with a budget of 35.65 crores INR. They bought Australian bowler Pat Cummins for 15.50 Cr, which was the highest amount ever for an overseas player at the auction. They also bought England captain Eoin Morgan (for 5.25 Cr), Rahul Tripathi, Tom Banton and Chris Green, and 48-year-old leg-spinner Praveen Tambe, who was bought at his base price of INR 20 lakhs.

Acquired at the auction Pat Cummins, Eoin Morgan, Tom Banton, Rahul Tripathi, Varun Chakravarthy, Manimaran Siddharth, Nikhil Naik, Chris Green, Pravin Tambe.

Offseason
Brendon McCullum expressed happiness after being appointed KKR's coach, saying it was an honour for him.

On 13 March 2020, the BCCI postponed the tournament until 15 April, in view of the ongoing coronavirus pandemic. After Narendra Modi said that the lockdown in India would last until at least 3 May 2020, the BCCI suspended the tournament indefinitely.

On 24 May, Indian sports minister Kiren Rijiju stated that the decision on whether or not to allow the tournament to be conducted in 2020 would be made by the Indian government based on "the situation of the pandemic". In June 2020, the BCCI confirmed that their preference was to host the tournament in India, possibly between September and October. On 24 July 2020, it was confirmed that the tournament would start from 19 September 2020.

Australian player Chris Green was banned from bowling in January 2020 for three months, due to an illegal action. He had been bought by Kolkata Knight Riders at a base price of INR 20 lakhs. Whether or not he would participate in the IPL season would depend on the League's Governing Council approval. A senior BCCI official confirmed that leg-spinner Pravin Tambe would not play in the IPL 2020 since he had played in T10 league.

Team analysis
ESPNcricinfo wrote "Like most teams in the Indian Premier League, Kolkata Knight Riders also have a great playing XI, which has six bowling options and many impact players. The team has done an excellent job by buying Morgan, Banton and Green. However, Pat Cummins sold for a record amount will also be under pressure to perform well for him. Apart from this, the team has tremendous all-rounders in the form of Narine and Russell. The bowling attack of the team will decide how it performs in 2020."

Gautam Gambhir said on the Star Sports Cricket Live show:

Season summary
On 23 September, Kolkata Knight Riders lost the opening match against Mumbai Indians. Dinesh Karthik won the toss and elected to field. Rohit Sharma 80 off 54 balls and Suryakumar Yadav 47 off 28 balls, contributed to a score of 195. Chasing a target of 196, the team had lost two wickets in a five overs. Shivam Mavi 9 off 10 balls was stumped on the final ball of the match and Knight Riders could only score 146/9 in 20 overs, losing the match by 49 runs.

Kolkata Knight Riders won their next match against Sunrisers Hyderabad by 7 wickets. Dinesh Karthik lost the toss and was put to field. Manish Pandey scored 51 off 28 balls, helped the Sunrisers finish the innings at 142/4 in 20 overs. Chasing a target of 143, the Knight Had had lost two wickets in a first five overs, but Shubman Gill 70 off 62 balls brilliant inning and their 92-run partnership with Eoin Morgan, helped the Knight Riders to beat the Sunrisers.

On 21 October 2020, Kolkata Knight Riders owned an ignominious record of becoming the team that finished with the lowest total in their allotted 20 overs without getting bowled out in the Indian Premier League against Royal Challengers Bangalore.

After 7 matches in the season, KKR had a change of captain. Dinesh Karthik allegedly stepped down voluntarily as he wanted "to focus on his batting and contributing more to the team’s cause". Eoin Morgan was henceforth appointed as the captain.

The team could win only 3 games in the second half of the league stage and ended up with 14 points. They had 7 wins and 7 losses from their 14 games. Royal Challengers Bangalore and Sunrisers Hyderabad also ended with 14 points. However, a lower net run rate resulted in KKR being knocked out of the tournament before the playoffs.

Squad 
 Players with international caps are listed in bold.

Administration and support staff

Kit manufacturers and sponsors

Kits

Sponsors 
Principal Sponsor:  MPL

Teams and standings

Results by match

League table

League stage

Statistics

Most runs

 Source:iplt20

Most wickets

 Source:iplt20

Player of the match awards

References

Kolkata Knight Riders seasons
2020 Indian Premier League